Chak Khaspur is a village in Baira Khanpur Gram panchayat in Bilhaur Tehsil, Kanpur Nagar district, Uttar Pradesh, India. Its village code is 149925. According to 2011 Census of India the total population of the village is 253, in which 138 are males and 115 are females.

References

Villages in Kanpur Nagar district